The 2012 Delta State Statesmen football represents Delta State University in the 2012 NCAA Division II football season as a member of the Gulf South Conference.

Schedule

References

Delta State
Delta State Statesmen football seasons
Delta State Statesmen football